Lake Rotomahana is an  lake in northern New Zealand, located 20 kilometres to the south-east of Rotorua. It is immediately south-west of the dormant volcano Mount Tarawera, and its geography was substantially altered by a major 1886 eruption of Mount Tarawera. Along with the mountain, it lies within the Okataina caldera.

Before the 1886 eruption, only two small lakes were present in the current lake's basin. High quality pictures of the then Lake Rotomahana and associated tourist attractions were widely available in Europe by 1875. Following the eruption, a number of craters filled over the course of 15 years to form today's Lake Rotomahana. It is the most recently formed larger natural lake in New Zealand, and the deepest in the Rotorua district. Lake Rotomahana has no natural outlet, and its water level varies by about one meter in response to rainfall and evaporation.

The lake is a wildlife refuge (and was one prior to first contact),  with all hunting of birds prohibited.  A healthy population of black swan inhabits the lake, and there are efforts underway to ensure the lake's largest island, Patiti Island, is kept pest-free. Recent research confirms Patiti Island is the closest surviving pre-eruption feature on the old lake, i.e. to survive the 1886 eruption, being formerly known as Rangipakaru Hill.  There is no public access to the lake, save for the Tourist Track, overland from Lake Tarawera.

A boat cruise on the lake, visiting hydrothermal features on the lake's shore, is available as an additional extra from the Waimangu Volcanic Valley tourism operation.

Pink and White Terraces

The Pink and White Terraces were a natural wonder on the shores of the lake before the 1886 eruption. They were considered to be the eighth wonder of the natural world and were New Zealand's most famous tourist attraction during the 19th century, from c. 1870-1886; but were buried or destroyed by the eruption.

More recent research reports over 2016-2020 suggest the upper parts of both terraces lie on land and may therefore be accessed for physical evidence the terraces or sections of them survived in their original locations.

The 2017- research relied on the journals of German-Austrian geologist Ferdinand von Hochstetter, who visited the lake in 1859. Hochstetter's journals are the only known survey of the terraces before the eruption. Using Hochstetter's field diaries and compass data, a team of New Zealand researchers identified a location where they believe the Pink and White Terraces lie preserved at a depth of 10–15 metres (32–49 ft). The researchers were hoping to raise funds for a full survey of the area, but any work would first have to be approved by the local Maori tribe on whose sacred ancestral land the Pink and White Terraces are situated. Ground penetrating radar searches were undertaken in 2017 but the equipment failed to penetrate sufficiently deeply to show whether or not the Terraces lay in their surveyed locations.  Later Hochstetter survey research refined the Pink, Black and White Terrace locations.

Green Lake
It should not be confused by the much larger Lake Rotokakahi (Green Lake), which lies to the west of Rotomahana.

Green Lake was formed in a roughly circular crater and is some 100 metres in diameter. It takes its name from its distinctive colour, which is considerably greener and darker than that of Rotomahana. The lake formed after the 1886 eruption of Mount Tarawera. Prior to the eruption, a small (~12m diameter) lakelet also known as Green Lake (Lake Rotopounamu) had existed to the north of Lake Rotomahana in Waikanapanapa Valley but this was exhumed during the Tarawera eruption. After the eruption, water flowed into the new Green Lake crater, which was given the same name as the older lake. Other pre-eruption lakes and lakelets about Lake Rotomahana included Lakes Rotomakariri, Rangipakaru, Ruahoata and Wairake. The shape, location and orientation of Lake Makariri in Cole, 1970 (cited herein)  is incorrect. He followed August Petermann's flawed map. Hochstetter shows the lake axis lay at an azimuth of 355 degrees. Recent research into these  lake levels gave insight into changes at Lake Rotomahana in the lead-up to the eruption.

The Sunken Totara Forest Myth 
One forgotten lake feature is the semi-mythical sunken totara forest of Lake Rotomahana. In 2016 when a scuba team first  dove the lake, they found no evidence of a sunken forest or trees, as reported by Fitzgerald off Moura. While there were forests over the pre-eruption Mt Tarawera, Totara trees were scattered and only recorded over the western and southern mountain flanks.  Given Totara tree groves could hardly appear in the eruption craters; it appears likely any sunken forest lies in the north-east corner of the new lake.

The placement of the sunken forest would have been post-eruption, via the mechanism described by the US Forest Service after the Mt. St. Helens eruption. The trees were uprooted in the eruption and propelled into the crater during or after the eruption. As the new lake formed over decades, the trunks floated for a time, then tipped vertically; later descending into a vertical lie, and became embedded into the lake floor coming to resemble a sunken forest. Hence, another myth about the Tarawera eruption and Lake Rotomahana is explained.

References

External links 

 Pink & White Terraces photos 
 The 1886 eruption
 The Pink and White terraces 2011

Lakes of the Bay of Plenty Region
Okataina Volcanic Centre
Volcanic crater lakes
1886 eruption of Mount Tarawera
Taupō Volcanic Zone